Mr. Garlund, also known as The Garlund Touch, is a television drama broadcast on the CBS network in the United States that aired on Friday nights in the 1960-61 television season.

Production
The show premiered on October 7, 1960.  The six episodes of the show were broadcast on the CBS network Fridays 9–9:30 PM (EST).  The name of the show was changed to The Garlund Touch on November 11, 1960, after the premiere of the fifth episode and before the premiere of the sixth episode in December.  Repeats continued until January 13, 1961.

Summary
The show presented the adventures of Frank Garlund (played by veteran TV character actor Charles Quinlivan), a mysterious young financial wizard, whose only confidants were his Asian half-brother Kam Chang,  and his foster-father Po Chang.  Stories revolved around "Garlund's rise in the world of international business and intrigue", and the profound effect Garlund had on people's lives.

Cast
 Charles Quinlivan as Frank Garlund
 Philip Ahn (whose later credits would include Master Kan in the TV series Kung Fu) as Po Chang
 Kam Tong (temporarily away from his recurring role as Kim Chan/Hey Boy on the concurrent TV series Have Gun, Will Travel) as Kam Chang

Episode list
 Episode 1 (Pilot) Original Air Date: October 7, 1960
 Frank testifies against a racketeer.
 Episode 2: The Towers Original Air Date: October 14, 1960
 Frank becomes the owner of two worthless towers due to a settlement in a will.
 Episode 3: ? Original Air Date: October 21, 1960
 Frank is accused of ordering the murder of a newspaper publisher.
 Episode 4: The X-27 Original Air Date: October 28, 1960
 The relationship between Frank and a test pilot's widow (Lisa Gaye) may have caused the release of an unstable aircraft.
 Episode 5: ? Original Air Date: November 4, 1960
 Not shown in New York City - instead, "Presidential Countdown" is listed in the New York Times at 9:30 for channel 2 between Route 66 and Twilight Zone 
 Episode 6: To Double, Double Vamp Original Air Date: December 23, 1960
 William Campbell guest-starred.

Reception
"This quirky light-hearted series from Paramount TV failed to catch on."

References

External links
   Mr. Garlund entry in the IMDB website

1960 American television series debuts
1960 American television series endings
CBS original programming
1960s American drama television series